Gulsher Ahmed (3 August 1921 – 20 May 2002) was a leader of the Indian National Congress. He studied in England and became a barrister. He was speaker Madhya Pradesh Vidhan Sabha, MLA and also MP from Satna Lok Sabha constituency. He was the 9th governor of Himachal Pradesh in 1993. He hailed from Madhya Pradesh. He contested from Amarpatan constituency for state assembly. He died in 2002 in Satna.

His son Sayeed Ahmad was also an MLA and became minister of state (finance and commercial tax).

Gulsher Ahmad had to resign from governor post when the Election Commission indicted him for campaigning for his son.

References

External links 
 https://web.archive.org/web/20070311012824/http://hpvidhansabha.nic.in/pgov.asp

1921 births
2002 deaths
Governors of Himachal Pradesh
People from Satna
Place of birth missing
India MPs 1980–1984
Speakers of the Madhya Pradesh Legislative Assembly
Lok Sabha members from Madhya Pradesh
Indian National Congress politicians from Madhya Pradesh
Rajya Sabha members from Madhya Pradesh
Indian expatriates in the United Kingdom